General elections were held in Mauritius on 21 October 1963. The result was a victory for the Labour Party, which won 19 of the 40 seats.

Results

References

Elections in Mauritius
1963 in Mauritius
Mauritius
Election and referendum articles with incomplete results
October 1963 events in Africa